Bishop Peter Stasiuk, C.Ss.R. (born 16 July 1943 in Roblin, Manitoba, Canada) is an Australian Ukrainian Greek Catholic hierarch. He served as the second Eparchial Bishop of Ukrainian Catholic Eparchy of Saints Peter and Paul of Melbourne from 16 December 1992 until 15 January 2020.

Life
Bishop Stasiuk was born to a family of ethnic Ukrainian Greek-Catholics in Canada. After attending the Eastern Redemptorists' minor seminary, he joined the Congregation of the Most Holy Redeemer in 1960, where he made his profession on 28 August 1962 and his solemn profession on 28 August 1965. Stasiuk was ordained as a priest on 2 July 1967, after studies at the Saint Paul University in Ottawa, Canada. Then he continued his studies in another Canadian university, University of Ottawa and in France in the François Rabelais University in Tours.

After returning from studies, he had various pastoral assignments and served as parish assistant, professor, superior and director at the Redemptorist Institutes in Canada.

On 16 December 1992 Fr. Stasiuk was nominated by Pope John Paul II and on 9 March 1993 consecrated to the Episcopate as the second eparchial bishop of the Ukrainian Catholic Eparchy of Saints Peter and Paul of Melbourne. The principal consecrator was Metropolitan Maxim Hermaniuk, the retired head of the Ukrainian Catholic Archeparchy of Winnipeg.

References

External links

1943 births
Living people
People from Roblin, Manitoba
Saint Paul University alumni
Australian Eastern Catholics
Bishops of the Ukrainian Greek Catholic Church
Redemptorist bishops
Canadian people of Ukrainian descent
Canadian emigrants to Australia
20th-century Eastern Catholic bishops
21st-century Eastern Catholic bishops
Eastern Catholic bishops in Oceania